Harold Fleming may refer to:

Harold C. Fleming (1926–2015), anthropologist and historical linguist
Harold Fleming (footballer) (1887–1955), English football player

See also
Harry Raymond Fleming
Harold Fleming Snead (1903–1987), judge